Presents Monk'estra, Volume 1 is an album by John Beasley. It earned Beasley a Grammy Award nomination for Best Large Jazz Ensemble Album.

References

2016 albums
Jazz albums by American artists